Vesuvius is an unincorporated community in Rockbridge County, Virginia, United States. Vesuvius has a post office with ZIP code 24483.

Macedonia Methodist Church in Amherst County was added to the National Register of Historic Places in 2012.

References

Unincorporated communities in Rockbridge County, Virginia
Unincorporated communities in Virginia